Yrjö Jahnsson (1877–1936) was a Finnish economics professor at the University of Helsinki, appointed in 1911. He openly criticized the strict monetary policy of the "orthodox" government and central bank in the early 1930s, and was ideologically aligned with the Fennoman movement. Jahnsson achieved business success and amassed a significant fortune during the 1920s and 1930s. His wife, Hilma Jahnsson (1882-1975), used the wealth to establish the Yrjö Jahnsson Foundation.

References

20th-century Finnish economists
1877 births
1936 deaths
Academic staff of the University of Helsinki